The following is a list of pipeline accidents in the United States in 1969. It is one of several lists of U.S. pipeline accidents. See also: list of natural gas and oil production accidents in the United States.

Incidents 

This is not a complete list of all pipeline accidents. For natural gas alone, the Pipeline and Hazardous Materials Safety Administration (PHMSA), a United States Department of Transportation agency, has collected data on more than 3,200 accidents deemed serious or significant since 1987.

A "significant incident" results in any of the following consequences:
 Fatality or injury requiring in-patient hospitalization.
 $50,000 or more in total costs, measured in 1984 dollars.
 Liquid releases of five or more barrels (42 US gal/barrel).
 Releases resulting in an unintentional fire or explosion.

PHMSA and the National Transportation Safety Board (NTSB) post-incident data and results of investigations into accidents involving pipelines that carry a variety of products, including natural gas, oil, diesel fuel, gasoline, kerosene, jet fuel, carbon dioxide, and other substances. Occasionally pipelines are re-purposed to carry different products.

The following incidents occurred during 1969:
 1969 On January 3, a gas explosion hit under a Manhattan borough street in New York City, New York, followed by a number of other gas explosions. 300 families were evacuated, and streets were cracked for four blocks. Difficulties of interconnected gas mains caused a seven-hour delay in shutting down the gas in the area.
 1969 On January 13, a Buckeye Partners 22-inch crude oil pipeline ruptured in Lima, Ohio, spilling 1,000 to 2,000 barrels of oil on a street and into the sewer system. 8,500 people were evacuated. The crude caught fire, damaging the sewerage treatment plant. Cracks from welding were blamed for the failure.
 1969 A 10-inch pipeline carrying aviation gasoline was ruptured by explosives on March 17 in Canyon, California The fuel caught fire shortly afterwards.
 1969 On April 18, a gas explosion destroyed a home in Bowling Green, Kentucky, killing two children. Damage by a contractor to the gas lines and gas mains in the area was thought to be the cause.
 1969 On May 6, a gas pipeline in Pittsburgh, Pennsylvania, that had been moved, was undergoing pressure testing when a cap on it blew off, hitting and rupturing another nearby gas pipeline. That pipeline exploded and burned, killing two workers, injuring eight other workers, and damaging three homes.
 1969 On May 9, an explosion & fire occurred at a pipeline gas compressor station, in Sunray, Texas. One worker was killed, and, 8 other workers were injured.
 1969 On June 3, a construction bulldozer hit a 30 inch gas transmission pipeline, near Moundsville, West Virginia. One person of the construction crew was killed.
 1969 The over-pressure of a low-pressure natural gas distribution system in Gary, Indiana caused numerous small fires and explosions. A gas company worker's errors allowed much higher than normal gas pressure in a gas distribution system. 56 square blocks were evacuated, seven people were injured, six homes destroyed, and 19 other homes damaged. Later, The National Transportation Safety Board called for upgraded gas pipeline safety standards.(June 3, 1969)
 1969 On June 6, a pressure release on a propane pipeline at a pump station near Barnesville, Georgia injured 3 workers. There was no fire or explosion.
 1969 On September 9, a converted natural gas pipeline running at 789 psi near Houston, Texas ruptured, causing a massive fire. Construction work downstream of the accident led to a pressure build up that caused the rupture. Seven people were injured, thirteen homes were destroyed, and eleven other homes damaged. Some of the homes were within 25 feet of the pipeline. The closest valves on this pipeline took 90 minutes to close.
 1969 On September 22, a tractor ripper bit ruptured a 24-inch natural gas transmission pipeline, in Seligman, Arizona, causing flames 300 feet high. 2 workers installing a coal slurry pipeline were killed, and, another seriously burned.
 1969 On September 23, a bulldozer being used as part of high tension power line construction hit a gas transmission pipeline in Proctor, West Virginia. The gas exploded and burned, injuring six of the electrical line construction crew. Another bulldozer had hit a gas pipeline in the same area some months before, killing another worker.
 On November 6, 1969, a bulldozer partially collapsed the steel covers of a gas regulator pit, in Burlington, Iowa. This caused damaged to the regulator, caused a five-times pressure surge in the gas distribution system. The gas fire caused major damage to ten homes, and, minor damage to 42 homes.
 1969 On November 19, telephone company contractors installing an underground cable hit a 10-inch gas pipeline in Vandyne, Wisconsin. Gas at 750 psi escaped, and ignited about 45 minutes later, killing one of the contractors, and injuring three others.
 1969 On December 17, a bulldozer at a rock quarry struck a propane pipeline, in Wetumpka, Alabama. The propane ignited, and burned into the next evening. There were no injuries.
 1969 On December 25, a land leveler ruptured a 22-inch natural gas transmission pipeline, in Hermiston, Oregon. Gas at 600 psi sprayed from the pipeline.

References

Lists of pipeline accidents in the United States
pipeline accidents
1969 in the environment
1969 in the United States